Pedro Autran Dourado Dutra Nicacio (born October 13, 1981) is a Brazilian former professional racing cyclist, who was the winner of the time trial at the 2006 Pan American Cycling Championships.

Major results

2004
 3rd Overall Tour de Santa Catarina
2005
 1st  Time trial, National Road Championships
 2nd  Time trial, Pan American Road Championships
 2nd Overall Tour de Santa Catarina
 3rd Overall Volta de São Paulo
2006
 1st  Time trial, Pan American Road Championships
 1st  Time trial, National Road Championships
 1st Overall Tour de Santa Catarina
1st Stage 5 (ITT)
 1st Stage 2b (ITT) Volta de Porto Alegre
 2nd Overall Volta de São Paulo
2007
 1st  Time trial, National Road Championships
 1st Stage 4 (ITT) Tour de Santa Catarina
 2nd Overall Volta do Rio de Janeiro
 4th Overall Volta de São Paulo
 5th Time trial, Pan American Road Championships
2008
 2nd Time trial, National Road Championships
2010
 1st Stage 8 (ITT) Vuelta del Uruguay
 2nd Time trial, National Road Championships
2014
 1st  Time trial, National Road Championships
2015
 4th Time trial, Pan American Road Championships

References

External links

1981 births
Living people
Brazilian male cyclists
Brazilian road racing cyclists
Cyclists at the 2007 Pan American Games
Sportspeople from São Paulo
Pan American Games competitors for Brazil
21st-century Brazilian people
20th-century Brazilian people